Maurice Mpolo (12 September 1928 – 17 January 1961) was a Congolese politician who served as Minister of Youth and Sports of the Republic of the Congo in 1960. He briefly led the Congolese army that July. He was executed alongside Prime Minister Patrice Lumumba in Katanga in 1961.

Biography
Maurice Mpolo was born on 12 September 1928 in Inongo, Belgian Congo. His father was Alphonse Membe. He had five years of primary education before studying as a novitiate for three years at the Fréres des Écoles Chrétiennes à Tumba. He later attended school in Léopoldville but was forced to drop out due to domestic problems. He became involved in several private enterprises and served in the colonial police force, though he was dismissed from duty on 10 September 1952, after being repeatedly reprimanded for displaying arrogance and indiscipline. Mpolo also worked as a journalist and was arrested by the Belgian administration for publishing opinions they considered "displaced", though he was freed after an appeal. He eventually became the president of the Léopoldville chapter of the Mouvement National Congolais (MNC) and participated in the Belgo-Congolese Round Table Conference in Brussels, Belgium on the organisation's behalf.

Government career 

With the independence of the Republic of the Congo in June 1960, Mpolo was elected to the Chamber of Deputies as a representative from the Lac Léopold II District. He was subsequently appointed by Prime Minister Patrice Lumumba to be Minister of Youth and Sports, effectively becoming the government's chief propagandist. He briefly stood in for General Victor Lundula as commander in chief of the Armée Nationale Congolaise (ANC) in July (earning the title of General) but got in a dispute with the army chief of staff, Colonel Joseph-Désiré Mobutu. On 28 July, Mpolo was made a member of a cabinet committee established to handle Congolese relations with United Nations officials. On 13 September, Lumumba declared him commander-in-chief of the ANC.

On 14 September, Mobutu launched a coup which "neutralised" Lumumba's government and created a new one. Mpolo attempted to undermine it and rivaled Mobutu for control of the army. On 23 September, Mpolo and Deputy Prime Minister Antoine Gizenga were arrested and plans were made to send them to secessionist Katanga. The United Nations (UN) put pressure on Mobutu to release them, which he did the following day. On 7 October, Lumumba announced that he had formed a new cabinet that included Mpolo as Minister of Defence. Mpolo told the press that he believed all of the conflicted parties in the central government would eventually unite. Angered by this, Mobutu dispatched troops to Mpolo's house, but he was nowhere to be found. Later that day Mpolo was able to return to his home unmolested and requested that the UN strengthen its guard at his residence.

Arrest and death 
In late November, Lumumba fled the capital to organise a new government in Stanleyville. He was captured before he could complete his escape and imprisoned at the army camp in Thysville. Mpolo also intended on reaching Stanleyville, but before he left he addressed a crowd of Lumumba's supporters at Lac Léopold II. With Mobutu's government fearing Mpolo's potential to rally support for his cause, troops were dispatched to find him and arrested him in Mushie. He was later transferred to Thysville, along with Vice President of the Senate Joseph Okito. On 17 January 1961, discipline in the base faltered and all three men were flown to Élisabethville, Katanga. Once there, they were brutally tortured at the hands of Moïse Tshombe and Godefroid Munongo, Lumumba's chief political rivals and the leaders of the secessionist state. That night, one by one they were lined up against a tree to be executed by firing squad. Mpolo was the second to be shot.

On 17 January 2011, a mass of thanksgiving was held in memory of Mpolo and Okito at the Notre-Dame Cathedral in Kinshasa.

Notes

Citations

References 

 
 
 
 
 
 
 
 
 
 
 

1928 births
1961 deaths
People from Mai-Ndombe Province
Mouvement National Congolais politicians
Members of the National Assembly (Democratic Republic of the Congo)
Government ministers of the Democratic Republic of the Congo
Lumumba Government members
Democratic Republic of the Congo military personnel
People murdered in the Democratic Republic of the Congo
Assassinated Democratic Republic of the Congo politicians
Deaths by firearm in the Democratic Republic of the Congo
Democratic Republic of the Congo torture victims
Executed Democratic Republic of the Congo people
People of the Congo Crisis
1961 murders in Africa